The Sree Maha Ganapathy temple is located in Thamarakulam, also known as the heart of Kollam. The main deity is Lord Vigneshwara, who is believed to be the person who takes responsibility of the whole region.

See also
 Temples of Kerala

Hindu temples in Kollam district
Ganesha temples